Leyland may refer to:

Places 
 Leyland, Lancashire, an English town
 Leyland Hundred, an hundred of Lancashire, England
 Leyland, Alberta, a community in Canada

Companies 
 Leyland Line, a shipping company

Automotive manufacturers 
 Leyland Motors, a defunct vehicle manufacturer based in Leyland, Lancashire
 Ashok Leyland, an Indian company
 British Leyland, a defunct vehicle manufacturer
 Leyland Bus, a defunct bus manufacturer
 List of Leyland buses
 Leyland DAF, a defunct commercial vehicle manufacturer
 Leyland Trucks, a medium and heavy duty truck manufacturer based in Leyland
 Leyland Eight, a luxury car
 Leyland P76, a car

People 
 Carl Sonny Leyland (born 1965), English pianist
 Frederick Richards Leyland (1832-1892), English shipowner
 Jim Leyland (born 1944), American baseball manager
 Joseph Bentley Leyland (1811-1851), English sculptor
 Kellie-Ann Leyland (born 1986), British footballer
 Mal Leyland (born 1945), Australian explorer and film-maker
 Maurice Leyland (1900-1967), English cricketer
 Mike Leyland (1941-2009), Australian explorer and film-maker
 Paul Leyland, British mathematician
 Paul Leyland (rugby league) (born 1986), English rugby league player
 Winston Leyland (born 1940), British-American author

Other 
 Leyland Band, a British band
 Leyland cypress, a tree
 Leyland number, a set of numbers named after Paul Leyland

See also 
 Leeland (disambiguation)
 Leland (disambiguation)
 Leyland Titan (disambiguation)